Hitched is a 1971 American comedy Western television film.

Plot
A young married couple struggles in the new west.

Cast
 Sally Field as Roselle Bridgeman
 Tim Matheson as Clare Bridgeman
 Neville Brand as Banjo Reilly
 Slim Pickens as Sam / Bart Dawson
 John Fiedler as Henry
 Denver Pyle as Ben Barnstable

References

External links
 Hitched at Letterbox DVD
 Hitched at IMDb

1971 television films
1970s English-language films
Films directed by Boris Sagal
Films scored by Patrick Williams
NBC network original films
American Western (genre) television films